Henry Schoenefeld, also spelled Henry Schoenfeld (October 4, 1857 in Milwaukee – August 4, 1936 in Los Angeles) was an American composer.

Schoenfeld studied in Germany at the Weimar Conservatory.  He moved to Chicago in 1879, when he began conducting Germania Männerchor that year and a mixed choir there from 1891 to 1902.  In 1904, he again became a choir master and conducted the Woman's Symphony Orchestra in Los Angeles.

His compositions included two operas, a Rural Symphony, a suite on Indian themes for strings, and two Indian legends, as well as numerous pieces for piano.

Schoenfeld taught at UCLA and many of his students, such as Roy Harris, went on to have successful careers. His son was the harpsichordist George Schoenefeld.

References

1857 births
1936 deaths
19th-century American composers
19th-century classical composers
19th-century conductors (music)
20th-century American composers
20th-century classical composers
20th-century American conductors (music)
American male conductors (music)
American male classical composers
American opera composers
American Romantic composers
Male opera composers
Musicians from Los Angeles
Musicians from Milwaukee
University of California, Los Angeles faculty
Classical musicians from California
Classical musicians from Wisconsin
20th-century American male musicians
19th-century American male musicians